Allium longispathum, the Mediterranean onion, is a species of flowering plant in the family Amaryllidaceae, native to Macaronesia and the Mediterranean basin. Some authorities consider it a subspecies of pale garlic, Allium paniculatum.

References

longispathum
Flora of the Canary Islands
Flora of Madeira
Flora of Morocco
Flora of Algeria
Flora of Tunisia
Flora of Southwestern Europe
Flora of Southeastern Europe
Flora of Turkey
Flora of the East Aegean Islands
Flora of Cyprus
Flora of Syria
Flora of Lebanon
Flora of Palestine (region)
Plants described in 1811